Potato Patch is a populated place in Yavapai County, Arizona, United States.

References

Populated places in Yavapai County, Arizona